MechAssault: Phantom War is an action video game, part of the MechWarrior series and part of the BattleTech universe created by FASA. Players assume the role of a BattleMech pilot in a 3D environment with a third person view of the combat via the top screen of the DS, while the touch screen displays the inside of the cockpit and acts as the game's controls.

Story
Still involving the struggle between the Houses and the Clans within the Inner Sphere, players assume the role of recently administered Mech Warrior Vallen Brice, an expert hacker and Tech Warrant who has been assigned a difficult mission. For the past sixty years, the planets among the Republic of the Sphere have been unable to communicate with each other as each planet's Hyperpulse Generators have been afflicted with a computer virus, rendering each Generator inoperable. Rumors spread throughout each House on the planets that the Hyperpulse Generators may be re-established as weapons during their inoperable state. The Lyran Alliance is the first to act on this rumor and the first to try shut it down by sending Vallen into combat to hack into each Hyperpulse Generator and ensure none of them are used for destructive purposes.

Reception

MechAssault: Phantom War received "average" reviews according to the review aggregation website Metacritic. The game received praise for its FMV cutscenes and voice acting. Common criticisms include lack of online play, lackluster graphics, shortness of the single player campaign, and issues with the game mechanics.

References

External links
 MechAssault: Phantom War at Majesco Entertainment
 

2006 video games
Action video games
BattleTech games
Eidos Interactive games
Majesco Entertainment games
MechWarrior
Nintendo DS games
Nintendo DS-only games
Video games about mecha
Video games developed in the United States
Video games set on fictional planets